More Than Ever may refer to:

 Come prima, an Italian song, the melody for which was used for an English song, "More Than Ever"
 More Than Ever (Blood, Sweat & Tears album), 1976
 More Than Ever (Rockapella album), 2002
 More Than Ever (Sims album), 2016
 "More Than Ever" (Nelson song), 1990
 More Than Ever (film), 2022